The Boston Evening-Post (August 18, 1735 – April 24, 1775) was a newspaper printed in Boston, Massachusetts, in the 18th century. Publishers included Thomas Fleet (d.1758), Thomas Fleet Jr. (d.1797), and John Fleet (d.1806).

See also
 The Weekly Rehearsal, predecessor to the Boston Evening-Post

References

Further reading

 Isaiah Thomas, Benjamin Franklin Thomas. The history of printing in America: with a biography of printers, and an account of newspapers, Volume 1. J. Munsell, printer, 1874.
 Albert Matthews. Check-list of Boston newspapers, 1704-1780. Colonial Society of Massachusetts, 1907.

Publications established in 1735
1775 disestablishments in the Thirteen Colonies
History of Boston
18th century in Boston
Defunct mass media in Boston
Defunct newspapers published in Massachusetts
18th century in the Thirteen Colonies
Newspapers of colonial America